The Açu Formation is an Early Cretaceous (Albian) geologic formation of the Potiguar Basin in Ceará, northeastern Brazil. The formation comprises coarse-grained sandstones deposited in a fluvio-deltaic environment. The Açu Formation, belonging to the Apodi Group, has provided fossils of an indeterminate rebbachisaurid.

Description 
The Açu Formation was deposited in a passive margin setting, overlying the Alagamar Formation and is overlain by the Jandaíra Formation. In the petroleum producing Potiguar Basin, the formation is a reservoir rock.

Fossil content 
The following fossils were reported from the formation:
 Reptiles
 Dinosaurs
 Carcharodontosauria indet.
 Maniraptora indet.
 Megaraptora indet.
 Rebbachisauridae indet.
 Spinosauridae indet.

See also 
 Crato Formation
 Romualdo Formation
 Malhada Vermelha Formation
 Missão Velha Formation

References

Bibliography 
  
 

Geologic formations of Brazil
Lower Cretaceous Series of South America
Cretaceous Brazil
Albian Stage
Sandstone formations
Deltaic deposits
Fluvial deposits
Reservoir rock formations
Paleontology in Brazil
Environment of Ceará
Landforms of Ceará
Northeast Region, Brazil